Taitung Prefecture was a division of Taiwan Province, which was created after 1887 during Qing rule. The prefecture's seat of government, originally at Tsui-be (水尾; modern-day Ruisui, Hualien), was moved to Pi-lam (卑南; modern-day Taitung City) in 1888. Plan to establish the sub-prefectures of Pi-lam and Hoe-lian-kang was aborted.

In 1895, with the Treaty of Shimonoseki and the successful Japanese invasion of Taiwan, the prefecture was reorganized as Taitō Chō in 1897 under Japanese rule.

See also
 Taiwan under Qing rule
 Taitō Prefecture

References

Taiwan under Qing rule
Prefectures of the Qing dynasty
1880s in Taiwan
1890s in Taiwan
1887 establishments in Taiwan
1895 disestablishments in China
1895 disestablishments in Taiwan
States and territories established in 1887
States and territories disestablished in 1895